Doppler (Doppler effect or Doppler shift) is the frequency change of a wave for observer relative to its source.

It may also refer to:
 Doppler (surname), a surname and a list of people with the name
 Christian Doppler (1803–1853), Austrian mathematician and physicist
 Doppler (building), a building in Seattle, home to Amazon.com's corporate headquarters
 Doppler (crater), a lunar impact crater
 Doppler (novel), a novel by Erlend Loe
 3905 Doppler, an asteroid
 Doppler, the mascot of the WNBA's Seattle Storm

See also 
 Dr. Doppler, the villain from Mega Man X3
 Doppler beaming
 Doppler broadening
 Doppler cooling
 Doppler cooling limit 
 Doppler echocardiography
 Doppler ultrasound, also called Doppler sonography
 Transcranial doppler 
 Doppler fetal monitor
 Doppler LIDAR
Doppler navigation set
 Doppler radar
 Doppler weather radar
 Doppler spectroscopy
Doppler velocity sensor
 Laser Doppler velocimetry
 Laser Doppler vibrometer 
 Photoacoustic Doppler effect 
 Photon Doppler velocimetry
 Pulse-Doppler radar
 Relativistic Doppler effect